Perserikatan Sepakbola Bandar Lampung or PSBL is a professional Indonesian football club which currently competes in Liga 3. Their home games are played at Pahoman Stadium, Bandar Lampung, which has a capacity of 15,000 (both standing and seated).

References

External links
 

Football clubs in Indonesia
Football clubs in Lampung
Association football clubs established in 1985
1985 establishments in Indonesia
Bandar Lampung
Lampung